Religious guild may refer to:

Archconfraternity, a Roman Catholic confraternity
Confraternity, a lay organization in the Roman Catholic Church
Confraternities of priests
Sodality (Catholic Church), also a lay organization in the Roman Catholic Church
Unions of Prayer

See also
Roman Catholic lay ecclesial movement